Man in a Plumed Beret is a c.1659-1661 oil on canvas painting attributed to Rembrandt.It is now in the National Gallery of Denmark in Copenhagen.

Sources
SMK | Søg i Samling

Portraits by Rembrandt
1659 paintings
1660 paintings
1661 paintings
Paintings in the collection of the National Gallery of Denmark
17th-century paintings in Denmark
Collections of the Gothenburg Museum of Art